Madagascar participated at the 2017 Summer Universiade which was held in Taipei, Taiwan.

Madagascar sent a delegation consisting of only 2 competitors for the event competing in 2 different sports.

Participants

References 

2017 in Malagasy sport
Nations at the 2017 Summer Universiade